Benjamin De Ceulaer (born 19 December 1983) is a Belgian former footballer. He had to retire in November 2018 because of injuries.

Career
On 20 January 2007, De Ceulaer played his first Eredivisie match with RKC Waalwijk against FC Twente. In the play-offs for a ticket to the Eredivisie he scored the winning goal in the third match against De Graafschap.

On 13 July 2010, he signed for K.S.C. Lokeren Oost-Vlaanderen leaving RKC.

In February 2012, he received his first call-up to the senior national team of his country for a friendly match against Greece.

Honours
Lokeren
Belgian Cup (1): 2011–12

Genk
Belgian Cup (1): 2012–13

References

External links
 
 

1983 births
Living people
Sportspeople from Genk
Footballers from Limburg (Belgium)
Association football forwards
Belgian footballers
Belgium youth international footballers
Belgium under-21 international footballers
Sint-Truidense V.V. players
Feyenoord players
RKC Waalwijk players
K.S.C. Lokeren Oost-Vlaanderen players
K.R.C. Genk players
Belgian Pro League players
Challenger Pro League players
Eredivisie players
Eerste Divisie players
Belgian expatriate footballers
Expatriate footballers in the Netherlands
Belgian expatriate sportspeople in the Netherlands
21st-century Belgian people